Mark McGraw (born 5 January 1971) is a Scottish former footballer, who played as a forward.

McGraw played for Greenock Morton, Hibernian, Falkirk, Clyde, Stirling Albion and Forfar Athletic. He played for Morton when his father, Allan McGraw, was the manager there.

References

External links

1971 births
Living people
Sportspeople from Rutherglen
Association football forwards
Scottish footballers
Greenock Morton F.C. players
Hibernian F.C. players
Falkirk F.C. players
Clyde F.C. players
Stirling Albion F.C. players
Forfar Athletic F.C. players
Scottish Football League players
Footballers from South Lanarkshire